Sir Brian Joseph Roche  (born ) is a New Zealand business executive.

Roche was born in the Hawke's Bay. He attended St John's College in Hastings. He obtained a Bachelor of Commerce and Administration from Victoria University of Wellington. He started his working career with Coopers and Lybrand in 1979 as an accountant. He stayed with the company, which later became PricewaterhouseCoopers, for 20 years and became a senior partner. In the 1990s, he was chief Crown negotiator for Treaty of Waitangi claims and settlements; he had a major influence on the 1997 Ngāi Tahu settlement.

In 2004, Roche became the inaugural chairman of the Auckland Regional Transport Authority. In 2008, he was appointed the inaugural chairman of the NZ Transport Agency. In the same year, he was appointed deputy commissioner of the Hawke's Bay District Health Board after the elected board was sacked by the then-Minister of Health, David Cunliffe. From January 2010 until April 2017, Roche was chief executive of New Zealand Post.

Since 2013, Roche was chairman of the Hurricanes rugby union franchise. He led the team that gained the 2011 Rugby World Cup hosting rights for New Zealand and later chaired group that organised the championship, taking over from Jock Hobbs. He has been chairman of Antarctica New Zealand, Tait Communications, and the Wellington Gateway Project. On 11 June 2019, Roche commenced his second term as chairman of the NZ Transport Agency. A condition of the appointment was Roche's resignation from the Wellington Gateway Project to avoid a conflict of interest.

In the 2017 New Year Honours, Roche was appointed a Knight Companion of the New Zealand Order of Merit, for services to the State and business.

In August 2020, Roche and Heather Simpson were chosen to lead a new group to support the Ministry of Health in improving COVID-19 border security.

References 

Year of birth missing (living people)
1950s births
Living people
Knights Companion of the New Zealand Order of Merit
New Zealand business executives
People educated at St John's College, Hastings
Victoria University of Wellington alumni
People from the Hawke's Bay Region
New Zealand sports executives and administrators
Hawke's Bay District Health Board members